Monika Chochlíková (born January 13, 1996) is a Slovak professional Muay Thai fighter and kickboxer. She won a gold medal in the WAKO world championships in 2019, is the first Slovak fighter ever to win the WAKO European championships and IFMA European championships, in 2021 she won WMC World Muaythai Title as first female fighter in Slovakia and in December 2021 she won gold on I.F.M.A. World Championship in Muaythai after 4 wins in Female Elite -51 kg as first Slovak fighter ever. In 2022 she won as first Muaythai fighter in The World Games IFMA after 3 winning fights.

Kickboxing and Muay Thai
Chochlíková started learning karate when she was six years old, and began practicing Muay Thai ten years later.

In 2016, Chochlíková was nominated for the first time to Slovakia's national kickboxing team to attend the European Championship WAKO in K1 in Maribor, Slovenia. She won the gold medal after three wins and became the first Slovak K1 fighter who won gold at a European championship.

In 2017, Chochlíková attended the World Games in Krakow and won the silver medal in the K1 discipline; for non-Olympic Slovakia sports, this was the best achievement at the competition.

In 2018, Chochlíková represented the national Slovak Muay Thai team as a draftee at the European Championship IFMA in Prague. After winning three rounds of fights, she became the European Muay Thai Champion IFMA as well as the first Slovak Muay Thai fighter. She was also awarded the "Rising Female Star" by the International Federation of Muay Thai Associations. Later that year, Chochlíková defended her gold medal at the European Championship WAKO in K1 in Bratislava.

In 2019, Chochlíková became World Champion K1 WAKO after 4 wins.

In 2020, Chochlíková became a professional soldier under Army Sports Center Banská Bystrica.

In 2021, Chochlíková beat in 5.round by TKO Turkish champion Funda Alkayis and became WMC World Champion in Muaythai in 51 kg.

In December 2021 after 4 wins Chochlíkova won gold on IFMA Muaythai World Championship in Bangkok in ELITE Female division -51 kg as first Slovak fighter ever.

In July 2022 Chochlíková was fighting on The World Games where she won Muaythai IFMA tournament and win gold after 3 wins for Slovakia. It was gold medal after 13 years on The World Games for Slovakia and became most successful sportsman of this country on this event.

Mixed martial arts career
On October 1, 2020, Chochlíková made her professional MMA debut in Bellator MMA as the first female fighter from Slovakia. She defeated Jade Jorand via the unorthodox "scorpion crunch" submission in the second round.

Chochlíková faced Giulia Chinello at OKTAGON 25 on June 19, 2021. He won the fight by unanimous decision.

Chochlíková faced Alessandra Pajuelo at OKTAGON 32 on April 8, 2022. She won the fight by unanimous decision.

Championships and accomplishments

K1 and Muay Thai 
2016 – W.A.K.O. European Championship in Maribor, Slovenia 1.place🥇–52 kg (K1)
2017 – W.A.K.O. World Cup in Innsbruck, Austria 1.place🥇–52 kg (K1)
2017 – W.A.K.O. World Cup in Rimini, Italy 1.place🥇–52 kg (K1)
2017 – The World Games 2017 in Wroclaw, Poland 2.place🥈–52 kg (K1) 
2017 – W.A.K.O. European Cup in Prague, the Czech Republic 1.place🥇–52 kg (K1)
2018 – I.F.M.A. European Championships in Prague, the Czech Republic 1.place🥇–51 kg
2018 – W.A.K.O. European Championship in Bratislava, Slovakia 1.place🥇–52 kg (K1)
2019 – I.F.M.A. World Championships in Bangkok, Thailand 3.place🥉–51 kg
2019 – EUSA Combat Games in Zagreb, Croatia 1.place🥇–56 kg (K1)
2019 – W.A.K.O. World Championships in Sarajevo, Bosnia and Herzegovina 1.place🥇–52 kg (K1)
2021 – WMC - World Muaythai Council World Muaythai Flyweight ( 51 kg) champion
2021 – W.A.K.O. World Championships in Lido Di Jesolo, Italy 2.place🥈–52 kg (K1)
2021 – I.F.M.A World Championships in Bangkok, Thailand 1.place🥇–51 kg (MT)
2022 – I.F.M.A The World Games in Birmingham, USA 1.place🥇–51 kg (MT)

Awards 
2017 – Best Female Fighter of Slovak Kickboxing Union 
2017 – 2. place as Non-Olympic Sportsman of Slovakia (K1)
2017 – Best Female fighter of Slovakia by website svetmma.sk 
2018 – Best Female fighter of Slovak Kickboxing Union 
2018 – Best Female fighter of Slovakia by website svetmma.sk 
2018 – Rising Female Star of I.F.M.A European Championship in Prague 
2019 – Best Female Fighter of Slovak Muaythai Association 
2019 – Best Nonolympic Sportsman of Slovakia (Muaythai, K1) 
2020 – Best Female fighter of Slovak Kickboxing Union 
2020 – Best Nonolympic Sportsman of Ministry of Defence Slovakia (Muaythai, K1)
2021 – Best Female Fighter of Slovak Muaythai Association
2021 – Best Nonolympic Sportsman of Ministry of Defence Slovakia (Muaythai, K1)
2022 – Best Nonolympic Sportsman of Ministry of Defence Slovakia (Muaythai, K1)

Mixed martial arts record

|-
|Loss
|align=center|3–1
|Katharina Dalisda
|Decision (unanimous)
|OKTAGON 37
|
|align=center|3
|align=center|5:00
|Ostrava, Czech Republic
|
|-
|Win
|align=center|3–0
|Alessandra Pajuelo
|Decision (unanimous)
|OKTAGON 32
|
|align=center|3
|align=center|5:00
|Ostrava, Czech Republic
|Strawweight.
|-
|Win
|align=center|2–0
|Giulia Chinello
|Decision (unanimous)
|OKTAGON 25
|
|align=center|3
|align=center|5:00
|Brno, Czech Republic
|Strawweight debut.
|-
|Win
|align=center|1–0
|Jade Jorand
|Submission (scorpion crunch)
|Bellator 247
|
|align=center|2
|align=center|3:50
|Milan, Italy
|Atomweight debut.
|-

Muay Thai & Kickboxing record 

|-
|- style="text-align:center; background:#cfc;"
| 2023-01-21 || Win || align="left" | Tuğbanur Kıvrak || PML 6: Homecoming ||Trenčín, Czech|| TKO (Knees)|| 2 || 0:56 

|-
|- style="text-align:center; background:#CCFFCC;"
| 2022-06-11 || Win || align="left" | Juliette Lacroix|| PML 3: The First Champion ||Brno, Czech|| Decision || 3 || 3:00

|- style="text-align:center; background:#CCFFCC;"
| 2022-01-29 || Win || align="left" | Aline Seiberth || PML 1: New Beginning  ||Trenčín, Slovakia|| Decision || 3 || 3:00
|-
|- style="text-align:center; background:#CCFFCC;"
| 2021-08-07 || Win || align="left" | Funda Alkayis || MTE 11  ||Trenčín, Slovakia|| TKO || 5 ||
|-
! style=background:white colspan=9 |
|-
|- style="text-align:center; background:#CCFFCC;"
| 2021-07-11 || Win || align="left" | Klára Strnadová || DFN 4 Superfight ||Banská Bystrica, Slovakia|| Decision || 3 || 3:00
|-

|- style="text-align:center; background:#CCFFCC;"
| 2020-06-20 || Win || align="left" | Viktória Bulínová || Oktagon Underground Superfight ||Bratislava, Slovakia|| Decision || 3 || 3:00

|- align="center" bgcolor="#FFBBBB"
| 2019-04-28 || Loss || align="left" | Aurore Dos Santos|| Enfusion Slovakia  ||Žilina, Slovakia|| Decision (Split) || 5 || 2:00
|-
! style=background:white colspan=9 |

|- style="text-align:center; background:#CCFFCC;"
| 2019-02-09 || Win || align="left" | Maryna Taran|| Muay Thai Evening X ||Trenčín, Slovakia|| Decision || 3 || 3:00
|-
|- style="text-align:center; background:#CCFFCC;"
| 2018-12-01 || Win || align="left" | Sylvia Juskiewicz || Enfusion #75 ||Třinec, Czech|| Decision || 3 || 3:00
|-

|-
|- style="text-align:center; background:#CCFFCC;"
| 2018-09-01 || Win || align="left" | Hiba Hosni || Muay Thai Evening 9 ||Trenčín, Slovakia|| Decision || 3 || 3:00
|-
| colspan=9 | Legend:    

|-
|- style="text-align:center; background:#CCFFCC;"
| 2022-07-17 || Win || align="left" | Meriem El-Moubarik|| The World Games IFMA 51 kg - Final ||Birmingham, USA|| Decision || 3 || 3:00
|-
! style=background:white colspan=9 |
|-
|- style="text-align:center; background:#CCFFCC;"
| 2022-07-16 || Win || align="left" | Rebeca Hodl|| The World Games IFMA 51 kg - 1/2 Final ||Birmingham, USA|| Decision || 3 || 3:00
|-
|- style="text-align:center; background:#CCFFCC;"
| 2022-07-15 || Win || align="left" | Angela Bahr|| The World Games IFMA 51 kg - 1/4 Final ||Birmingham, USA|| Decision || 3 || 3:00

|-
|- style="text-align:center; background:#CCFFCC;"
| 2021-12-12 || Win || align="left" | Yaren Kan|| I.F.M.A. World Championship 51 kg – Final ||Bangkok, Thailand|| Decision || 3 || 3:00
|-
! style=background:white colspan=9 |

|- style="text-align:center; background:#CCFFCC;"
| 2021-12-11 || Win || align="left" | Wansawang Srila Oo|| I.F.M.A. World Championship 51 kg – 1/2 Final ||Bangkok, Thailand|| Decision || 3 || 3:00
|-
|- style="text-align:center; background:#CCFFCC;"
| 2019-12-09 || Win || align="left" | Galina Degtiareva|| I.F.M.A. World Championship 51 kg – 1/4 Final ||Bangkok, Thailand|| Decision || 3 || 3:00
|-
|- style="text-align:center; background:#CCFFCC;"
| 2019-11-09 || Win || align="left" | Johanna Persson|| I.F.M.A. World Championship 51 kg – 1/8 Final ||Bangkok, Thailand|| Decision || 3 || 3:00
|-
|- align="center" bgcolor="#FFBBBB"
| 2021-10-24 ||Loss || align="left" | Melissa Lisset Martinez || W.A.K.O World Championship K1 52 kg Final ||Jesolo, Italy|| Decision || 3 || 2:00
|-
! style=background:white colspan=9 |
|- style="text-align:center; background:#CCFFCC;"
| 2021-10-23 || Win || align="left" | Stephnie Goode|| W.A.K.O World Championship K1 52 kg 1/2 || Jesolo, Italy || Decision || 3 || 2:00
|-
|- style="text-align:center; background:#CCFFCC;"
| 2021-10-22 || Win || align="left" | Daryna Ivanova|| W.A.K.O World Championship K1 52 kg 1/4 || Jesolo, Italy || Decision || 3 || 2:00
|-
|- style="text-align:center; background:#CCFFCC;"
| 2021-10-21 || Win || align="left" | Polina Petukhova|| W.A.K.O World Championship K1 52 kg 1/8 || Jesolo, Italy || Decision || 3 || 2:00
|-
|- style="text-align:center; background:#CCFFCC;"
| 2020-01-25 || Win || align="left" | Lenka Semethová|| National Muaythai Championship 57 kg Final ||Banská Bystrica, Slovakia|| Decision || 3 || 3:00

|- style="text-align:center; background:#CCFFCC;"
| 2020-01-25 || Win || align="left" | Adriana Vrbová|| National Muaythai Championship 57 kg – 1/2 Final ||Banská Bystrica, Slovakia|| Decision || 3 || 2:00
|-
|- style="text-align:center; background:#CCFFCC;"
| 2019-10-26 || Win || align="left" | Mariana Nunes|| W.A.K.O World Championship K1 52 kg – Final ||Sarajevo, Bosnia and Herzegovina|| Decision || 3 || 2:00
|-
! style=background:white colspan=9 |

|- style="text-align:center; background:#CCFFCC;"
| 2019-10-25 || Win || align="left" | Stasa Veic|| W.A.K.O World Championship K1 52 kg – 1/2 Final ||Sarajevo, Bosnia and Herzegovina|| Decision || 3 || 2:00
|-
|- style="text-align:center; background:#CCFFCC;"
| 2019-10-24 || Win || align="left" | Xantippi Raftopoulou|| W.A.K.O World Championship K1 52 kg – 1/4 Final ||Sarajevo, Bosnia and Herzegovina|| KO || 2 || 0:44
|-
|- style="text-align:center; background:#CCFFCC;"
| 2019-10-22 || Win || align="left" | Monica Balasoui|| W.A.K.O World Championship K1 52 kg – 1/8 Final ||Sarajevo, Bosnia and Herzegovina|| Decision || 3 || 2:00
|-
|- style="text-align:center; background:#CCFFCC;"
| 2019-08-03 || Win || align="left" | Ewa Pietrzykowska|| EUSA Combat Games W.A.K.O. K1 56 kg – Final ||Zagreb, Croatia|| Decision || 3 || 2:00
|-
! style=background:white colspan=9 |

|- style="text-align:center; background:#CCFFCC;"
| 2019-08-02 || Win || align="left" | Paulina Saczuk|| EUSA Combat Games W.A.K.O. K1 56 kg – 1/2 Final ||Zagreb, Croatia|| Decision || 3 || 2:00
|-
|- style="text-align:center; background:#CCFFCC;"
| 2019-08-01 || Win || align="left" | Antonina Osetska|| EUSA Combat Games W.A.K.O. K1 56 kg – 1/4 Final ||Zagreb, Croatia|| Decision || 3 || 2:00
|-
|- align="center" bgcolor="#FFBBBB"
| 2019-07-27 || Loss || align="left" | Bui Yen Ly|| I.F.M.A. World Championship 51 kg – 1/2 Final ||Bangkok, Thailand|| Decision || 3 || 3:00
|-
! style=background:white colspan=9 |

|- style="text-align:center; background:#CCFFCC;"
| 2019-07-26 || Win || align="left" | Anastasia Kulinich|| I.F.M.A. World Championship 51 kg – 1/4 Final ||Bangkok, Thailand|| Decision || 3 || 3:00
|-
|- style="text-align:center; background:#CCFFCC;"
| 2019-07-22 || Win || align="left" | Hoi Ling Kwok|| I.F.M.A. World Championship 51 kg – 1/8 Final ||Bangkok, Thailand|| Decision || 3 || 3:00

|-
|- style="text-align:center; background:#CCFFCC;"
| 2019-02-23 || Win || align="left" | Adriana Vrbová|| National Muaythai Championship 54 kg – Final ||Trenčín, Slovakia|| Decision || 3 || 3:00

|- style="text-align:center; background:#CCFFCC;"
| 2018-10-19 || Win || align="left" | Michaela Kerlehová|| WAKO European Championship K1 52 kg - Final ||Bratislava, Slovakia|| Decision || 3 || 2:00
|-
! style=background:white colspan=9 |

|- style="text-align:center; background:#CCFFCC;"
| 2018-10-17 || Win || align="left" | Marina Djekič|| WAKO European Championship K1 52 kg - 1/2 Final ||Bratislava, Slovakia|| Decision || 3 || 2:00
|-
|- style="text-align:center; background:#CCFFCC;"
| 2018-10-16 || Win || align="left" | Sibel Karabulut|| WAKO European Championship K1 52 kg - 1/4 Final ||Bratislava, Slovakia|| Decision || 3 || 2:00

|- style="text-align:center; background:#CCFFCC;"
| 2018-07-07 || Win || align="left" | Juliette Lacroix|| I.F.M.A. European Championship 51 kg - Final ||Prague, Czech Republic|| Decision || 3 || 3:00
|-
! style=background:white colspan=9 |

|- style="text-align:center; background:#CCFFCC;"
| 2018-07-05 || Win || align="left" | Galina Degtiareva|| I.F.M.A. European Championship 51 kg - 1/2 Final ||Prague, Czech Republic|| Decision || 3 || 3:00
|-
|- style="text-align:center; background:#CCFFCC;"
| 2018-07-01 || Win || align="left" | Valentyna Sentiurina|| I.F.M.A. European Championship 51 kg - 1/4 Final ||Prague, Czech Republic|| Decision || 3 || 3:00
|-
|- align="center" bgcolor="#FFBBBB"
| 2017-11-04 || Loss || align="left" | Myriame Djedidi || 2017 WAKO World Championships, 1/4 Final ||Budapest, Hungary|| Decision || 3 || 2:00
|-
|- align="center" bgcolor="#FFBBBB"
| 2017-07-28 || Loss || align="left" | Anna Poskrebysheva || 2017 IWGA World Games, Final ||Wrocław, Poland|| Decision || 3 || 2:00
|-
! style=background:white colspan=9 |
|-
|- align="center" bgcolor="#CCFFCC"
| 2017-07-27 || Win || align="left" | Elghoul Ahlam || 2017 IWGA World Games, 1/2 Final ||Wrocław, Poland|| Decision || 3 || 2:00
|-
|- align="center" bgcolor="#CCFFCC"
| 2017-07-26 || Win || align="left" | Ashley Acord || 2017 IWGA World Games, 1/4 Final ||Wrocław, Poland|| Decision || 3 || 2:00

|- align="center" bgcolor="#CCFFCC"
| 2016-10- || Win || align="left" | Myra Winkelman || 2016 WAKO Senior European Championships, Final ||Maribor, Slovenia|| Decision (3:0) || 3 || 2:00
|-
! style=background:white colspan=9 |

|- align="center" bgcolor="#CCFFCC"
| 2016-10- || Win || align="left" | Anna Poskyrebysheva || 2016 WAKO Senior European Championships, Semi Final ||Maribor, Slovenia|| Decision (2:1) || 3 || 2:00

|- align="center" bgcolor="#CCFFCC"
| 2016-10- || Win || align="left" | Hanna Raatesalmi || 2016 WAKO Senior European Championships, 1/4 Final ||Maribor, Slovenia|| Decision (3:0) || 3 || 2:00

|-
| colspan=9 | Legend:

References

External links
 
 

1996 births
Living people
Slovak female kickboxers
Slovak female mixed martial artists
Mixed martial artists utilizing Muay Thai
Mixed martial artists utilizing karate
Slovak Muay Thai practitioners
Female Muay Thai practitioners
Slovak female karateka
Bellator female fighters
20th-century Slovak women
21st-century Slovak women